Cron is a time-based job scheduler in Unix-like computer operating systems.

CRON or cron may also refer to:

People
 Emmanuel Macron, French president
 Chris Cron (born 1964), American baseball manager
 Claudia Cron, American actress and model
 C. J. Cron (born 1990), American professional baseball player
 Kevin Cron (born 1993), American professional baseball player

Other uses
 CRON-diet, the Calorie Restriction with Optimal Nutrition diet
 Cron, a character in the animated series Teen Titans

See also
 Cronin (Old Irish crón), a surname (and a list of people with the name)
 CronLab, a computer company
 Crohn's disease, a type of inflammatory bowel disease